Composita is an extinct brachiopod genus that lived from the Late Devonian to the Late Permian. Composita had a cosmopolitan global distribution, having lived on every continent except Antarctica. Composita had a smooth shell with a more or less distinct fold and sulcus and a round opening for the pedicle on the pedicle valve. Composita is included in the family Athyrididae (Order Athyridida) and placed in the subfamily Spirigerellinae.

Related genera include Cariothyris and Planalvus along with Athyris.

Species 
The following species within this genus have been described:

 C. advena (Grant, 1976)
 C. affinis Girty, 1909
 C. apheles Cooper and Grant, 1976
 C. apsidata Cooper and Grant, 1976
 C. bamberi Shi and Waterhouse, 1996
 C. biforma Yang, 1991
 C. bucculenta Cooper and Grant, 1976
 C. costata Cooper and Grant, 1976
 C. cracens Cooper and Grant, 1976
 C. crassa Cooper and Grant, 1976
 C. depressa Sun, 1991
 C. discina Cooper and Grant, 1976
 C. elongata Dunbar and Condra, 1932
 C. emarginata (Girty, 1909)
 C. enormis Cooper and Grant, 1976
 C. girtyi Raymond, 1911
 C. grandis Cooper, 1953
 C. hapsida Stehli and Grant, 1970
 C. huagongensis Liao, 1979
 C. idahoensis Butts, 2007
 C. imbricata Cooper and Grant, 1976
 C. indosinensis (Mansuy, 1914)
 C. insulcata Zeng et al., 1995
 C. jogensis Yanagida & Nishikawa, 1984
 C. magnicarina Campbell, 1961
 C. mexicana (Hall, 1857)
 C. minuscula Chronic, 1949
 C. mira (Girty, 1899)
 C. misriensis (Reed, 1944)
 C. nucella Cooper and Grant, 1976
 C. ovata (Mather, 1915)
 C. parasulcata Cooper and Grant, 1976
 C. pilula Cooper and Grant, 1976
 C. plana Yancey, 1978
 C. prospera Cooper and Grant, 1976
 C. pyriformis Cooper and Grant, 1976
 C. quadrirotunda (Lee and Su, 1980)
 C. quantilla Cooper and Grant, 1976
 C. rotunda Snider, 1915
 C. sigma Gordon, 1975
 C. stalagmium Cooper and Grant, 1976
 C. strongyle Cooper and Grant, 1976
 C. subcircularis Brill, 1940
 C. subquadrata (Hall, 1858) 
 C. subtilita (Hall, 1852)
 C. tareica Chernyak, 1963
 C. tetralobata Hoare, 1960
 C. tobaensis Wang, 1985
 C. trinuclea (Hall, 1956)

References 

Prehistoric brachiopod genera
Devonian first appearances
Permian genus extinctions
Paleozoic life of Alberta
Paleozoic life of British Columbia
Paleozoic life of the Northwest Territories
Paleozoic life of Nova Scotia
Paleozoic life of Yukon
Devonian Colombia
Fossils of Afghanistan
Fossils of Australia
Fossils of Belgium
Fossils of Bolivia
Fossils of Brazil
Fossils of Canada
Fossils of China
Fossils of Colombia
Fossils of Egypt
Fossils of Greece
Fossils of Guatemala
Fossils of Indonesia
Fossils of Iran
Fossils of Japan
Fossils of Libya
Fossils of Mexico
Fossils of Pakistan
Fossils of Peru
Fossils of Russia
Fossils of Thailand
Fossils of Tunisia
Fossils of Great Britain
Fossils of the United States
Fossils of Venezuela
Taxa described in 1849
Fossil taxa described in 1849